Passing Through is the sixteenth studio album released by American country music singer Randy Travis. It is his fourth album for Word Records. The album produced two singles on the Billboard country charts: "Four Walls" at #46 and "Angels" at #48. "That Was Us" was previously recorded by Tracy Lawrence on his 2001 self-titled album.

Recording
Tracks 1, 2, 3, 6 & 11 were recorded in September 2001 at the Sound Emporium in Nashville. The rest of the songs were recorded in June 2004 at Cartee Day Studios in Nashville. According to the liner notes, 20 songs were recorded for this album.

Track listing
"Pick Up the Oars and Row" (Jamie O'Hara) – 2:50
"Four Walls" (Don Rollins, Harry Stinson, D. Vincent Williams) – 3:42
"That Was Us" (Craig Wiseman, Tony Lane) – 3:25
"Angels" (Harvey McNalley, Buck Moore, Troy Seals) – 3:46
"Running Blind" (Roger D. Ferris) – 2:52
"My Daddy Never Was" (Lane) – 3:56
"A Place to Hang My Hat" (Shawn Camp, Byron Hill, Brice Long) – 3:15
"Right On Time" (Al Anderson, Sharon Vaughn) – 3:58
"My Poor Old Heart" (Camp, Gary Harrison) – 2:46
"I'm Your Man" (Randy Travis) – 3:27
"Train Long Gone" (Dennis Linde) – 3:56
"I Can See It in Your Eyes" (Travis, Pastor Matthew Hagee) – 4:17

Personnel

 Al Anderson - acoustic guitar, electric guitar, soloist
 Larry Beaird - acoustic guitar
 Eric Darken - percussion
 Dan Dugmore - acoustic guitar, electric guitar, pedal steel guitar
 Pat Flynn - acoustic guitar
 Larry Franklin - fiddle
 Paul Franklin - pedal steel guitar
 Steve Gibson - acoustic guitar, electric guitar, gut string guitar
 Vicki Hampton - background vocals
 Tony Harrell - Hammond B-3 organ
 Wes Hightower - background vocals
 Johnny Hiland - electric guitar
 David Hungate - bass guitar, upright bass
 John Barlow Jarvis - Hammond B-3 organ, piano, electric piano, Wurlitzer
 John Jorgenson - electric guitar, slide guitar
 Viktor Krauss - upright bass
 Kyle Lehning - electric guitar
 Paul Leim - drums
 Dennis Linde - background vocals
 Charlie McCoy - bass harmonica, harmonica
 Kenny Malone - drums, bells, tambourine
 Brent Mason - electric guitar
 Gordon Mote - piano
 Matt Rollings - Juno synthesizer, Hammond B-3 organ
 Lisa Silver - background vocals
 Bryan Sutton - acoustic guitar, resonator guitar
 Randy Travis - lead vocals
 Cindy Richardson-Walker - background vocals
 Casey Wood - bass drum, tambourine

Charts

Weekly charts

Year-end charts

Awards

On 2005, the album won a Dove Award for Country Album of the Year at the 36th GMA Dove Awards.

References

[ Passing Through] at allmusic

2004 albums
Randy Travis albums
Word Records albums
Albums produced by Kyle Lehning